Sterns is a surname. Notable people with the name include:

Caden Sterns (born 1999), American football player
Henry Sterns, American bobsledder 
Jerreth Sterns (born 1999), American football player
Jonathan Sterns (1751–1798), Loyalist
Kate Sterns, Canadian writer

See also
Stearns (surname)
Stern (surname)